Corrie van Gorp (30 June 1942 – 22 November 2020) was a Dutch actress and singer.

Filmography
Pretfilm (1976)
Hotel de Botel (1976)
André's kerstshow (1978)
De Flip Fluitketel show (1980–1981)
Het beste van André (1981)
Ik ben Joep Meloen (1981)
Boem-Boem (1982)
André's Comedy Parade (1982)
De Poppenkraam (1985)
De Dik Voormekaar show (2009)
De Wereld Draait Door (2010)

Discography
Wim Sonneveld Met Willem Nijholt En Corrie van Gorp (1971)
Wim Sonneveld Met Willem Nijholt En Corrie Van Gorp II (1974)
Corrie Van Gorp (1978)

References

External links
 
 

1942 births
2020 deaths
Dutch actresses
Dutch singers
20th-century Dutch actresses
21st-century Dutch actresses